Hrafnhildur Lúthersdóttir (born 2 August 1991 in Hafnarfjörður is an Icelandic former swimmer. Born in Iceland, Lúthersdóttir moved to the United States to study public relations and swam for the University of Florida.

At the 2012 Summer Olympics, she was competed in the 4×100-medley relay but did not win a medal.  She also competed in the 200 m breaststroke but did not progress past the first round.

At the 2016 Summer Olympics, she competed for Iceland in both the 100 m breaststroke and the 200 m breaststroke. She finished 6th in the 100 m breaststroke with a time of 1:07.18 and 5th in her semifinal of the 200 m breaststroke with a time of 2:24.41. She did not qualify for the finals, but was the flag bearer for Iceland during the closing ceremony. That same year, she won three medals at the European Championships, silver in the women's 50 and 100 m breaststroke, and bronze in the women's 200 m breastroke.

Personal life
Hrafnhildur is the sister of musician Auðunn Lúth­ers­son, better known as Auður.

References

Icelandic female breaststroke swimmers
Icelandic female freestyle swimmers
Icelandic female medley swimmers
1991 births
Living people
Hrafnhildur Luthersdottir
Swimmers at the 2012 Summer Olympics
Swimmers at the 2016 Summer Olympics
People from Hafnarfjörður